Worcester is a census-designated place (CDP) that comprises the main village in the town of Worcester, Washington County, Vermont, United States. The population of the CDP was 112 at the 2010 census.

Geography

References

Census-designated places in Vermont
Census-designated places in Washington County, Vermont